Hand in Hand is a studio album by American jazz pianist Mulgrew Miller with Kenny Garrett on alto saxophone, Joe Henderson on tenor saxophone, Eddie Henderson on trumpet, Steve Nelson on vibraphone, Christian McBride on bass, and Lewis Nash on drums. The record was released in 1993 by Novus Records. It is Miller's ninth album as a bandleader.

Reception
Scott Yanow of AllMusic wrote: "Mulgrew Miller, a talented McCoy Tyner-influenced pianist, leads an all-star septet on much of this date. The main stars, however, are Miller's nine diverse originals which range from modal to Monkish. With tenor-saxophonist Joe Henderson appearing on five selections, trumpeter Eddie Henderson on six and altoist Kenny Garrett heard throughout the full CD, Miller has a perfect frontline to interpret his tricky but logical originals."

Zan Stewart of the Los Angeles Times noted: "Pianist and composer Miller, making his Novus debut after eight sessions for Landmark, presents a splendid assortment of nine modern mainstream originals—one's by pianist Donald Brown—that are inventive, warm, visceral, swinging, direct and unabashedly musical."

Track listing

Personnel 
Band
Mulgrew Miller – piano, composer, liner notes, producer
Kenny Garrett – sax (alto), sax (soprano)
Eddie Henderson – flugelhorn, trumpet
Joe Henderson – sax (tenor)
Christian McBride – bass
Lewis Nash – drums
Steve Nelson – vibraphone

Production
Steve Backer – director
Daniela Barcelo – design
Orrin Keepnews – producer
Danny Miller – photography
Jacqueline Murphy – art direction
James Nichols – mastering, mixing

Chart performance

References 

1992 albums
Novus Records albums
Mulgrew Miller albums
Albums produced by Orrin Keepnews